Barefoot is a 2014 American romantic comedy-drama film directed by Andrew Fleming and distributed by Roadside Attractions. It was written by Stephen Zotnowski and is a remake of the 2005 German film Barfuss. Its story follows Jay, the son of a wealthy family who meets Daisy, a psychiatric patient who was raised in isolation, as he takes her home for his brother's wedding. It stars Evan Rachel Wood, Scott Speedman, Treat Williams, Kate Burton and J. K. Simmons.

The film was produced by WhiteFlame Productions and premiered at the Santa Barbara International Film Festival on February 2, 2014, before receiving a limited release on February 21, 2014. It grossed $11,767 during its opening weekend and $15,071 worldwide. It received negative reviews and has a 14% approval rating based on 21 reviews on Rotten Tomatoes.

Plot

Jay Wheeler, the "black sheep" son of a rich family, works as a janitor at a Los Angeles, California psychiatric hospital as part of his probation. While walking through the hospital one night he overhears another janitor, Frakel, telling a patient that he's a doctor in order to rape her. After hearing this, Jay knocks out Frakel and tells the patient, Daisy Kensington, to go back to bed. Daisy, having been admitted to the hospital after being raised in isolation and being barefoot all her life, decides to follow Jay out of the hospital.

Rather than send Daisy back, Jay brings her home for his brother's wedding in New Orleans, Louisiana to convince his family that he has straightened out his life. While she impresses them with her genuine, if unstable, charm, she also admits to Jay that she was in the hospital for killing her mother. While at the wedding Jay's father, suspecting that something is amiss, presses her for information, causing Daisy to have a panic attack. As Jay gets her into a cab, surrounded by his family, he tells them the truth about his job, only having come home to get money to pay back a loan shark. When Jay and Daisy return to his parents' house they search through his father's cars for keys and find a set in a classic RV, in which they set out for home. Despite getting along while driving Jay leaves Daisy at a bus station in Shreveport, Louisiana, intending to abandon her, but ends up having a change of heart and goes back for her.

Their journey becomes a fun adventure, despite the fact that they are both being hunted; Daisy for escaping the hospital and Jay for taking her and violating his probation. As Jay is the only one who can drive, they pull over so he can sleep. During the night Daisy wakes him up due to a cop having pulled up behind. While Jay hides in the cupboard Daisy tells the cop that her boyfriend, "Beaver," ran away when he saw the flashing lights. The cop tells her that his father's name was Beaver, before proceeding to check the RV. After checking the bathroom, which smells bad because they can't flush it, he leaves and walks into the bush on the side of the road to find "Beaver." While the cop is distracted Daisy throws away the keys to his car, so that she and Jay can escape, causing Jay to see her in a different light. A few nights later they go to a carnival, which Daisy has never been to before, claiming that it is "the best day of her life."

Later when they make a stopover, Jay makes a phone call to Dr. Bertleman, the doctor who was handling Daisy. She then overhears him say that he is going to take her back to Los Angeles only to bring her back to the psychiatric hospital. She runs away crying to the RV alone and attempts to drive away before Jay can get to her. As she only knows the basics that Jay taught her, she ends up driving around the parking lot in circles before crashing the RV. As Jay opens the door, she climbs out crying, as other people come to check on them. Jay then hurries them both into a diner. Jay, curious about Daisy, not truly believing she's schizophrenic as her doctor believes, asks her about whether the voices told her to kill her mother. Daisy tells him that it wasn't her who heard voices, but her mother. Her mother was screaming one night but Daisy didn't go to her, and when she woke up in the morning her mother was dead, causing Daisy to believe that she killed her mother. As Jay vehemently tells Daisy that she didn't kill her mother, a group of cop cars show up at the diner to arrest Jay and Daisy, assuming that one of the bystanders to the crash called them. As Jay kisses Daisy, the cops come into the diner and handcuff Jay.

When Jay's mother finds out he's in jail, she persuades his father to bail him out, which he does. When Jay returns to his apartment, he finds the door smashed open and his belongings torn apart. Glancing out the window he sees one of the loan shark's goons waiting for him outside, just as the loan shark looks up and sees him. After fleeing his apartment complex, Jay goes to the psychiatric hospital to see Daisy, but the security and Dr. Bertleman tell him to leave.

Desperate, Jay goes to the train station and lies down on the tracks, so that he'll be deemed suicidal and be taken to the psychiatric hospital. Dr. Bertleman, knowing that Jay is fine and that it was just a ruse, dismisses Jay, but after Jay insists that he is suicidal, the doctor puts him in solitary confinement. Before Jay is taken away, he tells the doctor that it wasn't Daisy who heard voices but her mother. While at the hospital, another patient gives Jay information on Daisy's well-being and confirms that they're being kept apart.

That night Frakel sneaks the loan shark's goon into the hospital, where he then goes and strangles Jay using a chain. As Jay is struggling to get him off, the patient who was giving him information takes out the goon by hitting him in the head with a broom. After this Jay wakes up in the hospital, where Dr. Bertleman apologizes to Jay about Frakel and tells him he was right about Daisy's mother, who was schizophrenic. Dr. Bertleman then decides to release them both from the hospital. Before Jay goes to meet Daisy, he gets a letter from his father, which contains a $40,000 check to pay off his debts. Jay then meets Daisy at the hospital entrance, where they hug and kiss before leaving together, hand in hand.

As the credits start to roll, the last scene shows Daisy and Jay riding a merry-go-round.

Cast
 Evan Rachel Wood as Daisy Kensington
 Scott Speedman as Jay Wheeler
 Treat Williams as Mr. Wheeler
 Kate Burton as Mrs. Wheeler
 J. K. Simmons as Dr. Bertleman
 Ricky Wayne as Mr. Frakel
 Thomas Francis Murphy as Mr. Bryant

Reception
Barefoot received mostly negative reviews. On Rotten Tomatoes it holds a 17% rating, with an average score of 4.2/10, based on 23 reviews. 

Barbara VanDenburgh of the Arizona Republic rated the film 1.5 out of 5 stars and called the film an "offensively infantilizing [...] spectacularly wrong-headed, chemistry-free romance, and too dumb to know how sexist it is" and calling Evan Rachel Wood's character "a cartoon character" similar to the Little Mermaid who "all but brushes her hair with a fork".

References

External links
 
 

2014 films
2014 romantic comedy-drama films
American romantic comedy-drama films
Films directed by Andrew Fleming
Films set in Louisiana
American remakes of German films
Roadside Attractions films
2014 comedy films
2014 drama films
2010s English-language films
2010s American films